Pierre Adrien Joliot-Curie (born 12 March 1932 in Paris) is a noted French biologist and researcher for the CNRS. A researcher there since 1956, he became a Director of Research in 1974 and a member of their scientific council in 1992. He was a scientific advisor to the French Prime Minister from 1985 to 1986 and is a member of Academia Europæa. He was made a commander of the Ordre National du Mérite (English: the National Order of Merit) in 1982 and of the Légion d'honneur (English: Legion of Honor) in 1984.

Pierre Joliot held the Chair of Cellular Bioenergetics (1981–2002) at the Collège de France and is now emeritus professor. He is also a member of the Academy of Science of France. He won the Prize «Lombardia è Ricerca» 2021 and the Prize «Lombardia è Ricerca» 2019. In 2002, he published a paper presenting the design of the research, 'La Recherche Passionnément' (English: Research Passionately).

Family
Joliot comes from the Curie Family science dynasty. His grandparents, Marie and Pierre Curie together with Henri Becquerel won the Nobel Prize in Physics in 1903 for their study of radioactivity. Marie also won the Nobel Prize in Chemistry in 1911.  Joliot's parents, Irène Joliot-Curie and Frédéric Joliot-Curie, won the Nobel Prize in Chemistry in 1935 for their discovery of Induced radioactivity. His sister, Hélène Langevin-Joliot, is a noted nuclear physicist. He is married to biologist Anne (née Gricouroff) Joliot-Curie and they have two sons, Marc Joliot (b. 1962) and Alain Joliot (b. 1964).

References

French biologists
French biochemists
Academic staff of the Collège de France
Recipients of the Legion of Honour
Commanders of the Ordre national du Mérite
French people of Polish descent
1932 births
Living people
Members of Academia Europaea
Members of the French Academy of Sciences
Scientists from Paris
Foreign associates of the National Academy of Sciences
Pierre Joliot
Research directors of the French National Centre for Scientific Research